Glaciers, loosely defined as patches of currently or recently flowing ice, are thought to be present across large but restricted areas of the modern Martian surface, and are inferred to have been more widely distributed at times in the past. Lobate convex features on the surface known as viscous flow features and lobate debris aprons, which show the characteristics of non-Newtonian flow, are now almost unanimously regarded as true glaciers.

However, a variety of other features on the surface have also been interpreted as directly linked to flowing ice, such as fretted terrain,  lineated valley fill, concentric crater fill, and arcuate ridges.  A variety of surface textures seen in imagery of the midlatitudes and polar regions are also thought to be linked to sublimation of glacial ice.

Today, features interpreted as glaciers are largely restricted to latitudes polewards of around 30° latitude. Particular concentrations are found in the Ismenius Lacus quadrangle. Based on current models of the Martian atmosphere, ice should not be stable if exposed at the surface in the mid-Martian latitudes. It is thus thought that most glaciers must be covered with a layer of rubble or dust preventing free transfer of water vapor from the subliming ice into the air. This also suggests that in the recent geological past, the climate of Mars must have been different in order to allow the glaciers to grow stably at these latitudes. This provides good independent evidence that the obliquity of Mars has changed significantly in the past, as independently indicated by modelling of the orbit of Mars. Evidence for past glaciation also appears on the peaks of several Martian volcanoes in the tropics.

Like glaciers on Earth, glaciers on Mars are not pure water ice. Many are thought to contain substantial proportions of debris, and a substantial number are probably better described as rock glaciers. For many years, largely because of the modeled instability of water ice in the midlatitudes where the putative glacial features were concentrated, it was argued that almost all glaciers were rock glaciers on Mars. However, recent direct observations made by the SHARAD radar instrument on the Mars Reconnaissance Orbiter satellite have confirmed that at least some features are relatively pure ice, and thus, true glaciers. Some authors have also made claims that glaciers of solid carbon dioxide have formed on Mars under certain rare conditions.

Some landscapes look just like glaciers moving out of mountain valleys on Earth.  Some appear to have a hollowed out center, looking like a glacier after almost all the ice has disappeared.  What is left are the moraines—the dirt and debris carried by the glacier.   These supposed alpine glaciers have been called glacier-like forms (GLF) or glacier-like flows (GLF).   Glacier-like forms are a later and maybe more accurate term because we cannot be sure the structure is currently moving.  Another, more general term sometimes seen in the literature is viscous flow features (VFF).

Radar studies
Radar studies with the SHAllow RADar (SHARAD) on the Mars Reconnaissance Orbiter showed that lobate debris aprons (LDA) and lineated valley fill (LVF) contain pure water ice covered with a thin layer of rocks that insulated the ice. Ice was found both in the southern hemisphere  and in the northern hemisphere.  Researchers at the Niels Bohr Institute combined radar observations with ice flow modelling to say that ice in all of the Martian glaciers is equivalent to what could cover the entire surface of Mars with 1.1 meters of ice.  The fact that the ice is still there suggests that a thick layer of dust is protecting the ice; the current atmospheric conditions on Mars are such that any exposed water ice would sublimate.

Climate changes

It is thought that ice accumulated when Mars' orbital tilt was very different from the present (the axis the planet spins on has considerable "wobble," meaning its angle changes over time).  A few million years ago, the tilt of the axis of Mars was 45 degrees instead of its present 25 degrees.  Its tilt, also called obliquity, varies greatly because its two tiny moons cannot stabilize it like the Moon stabilizes Earth.

Many features on Mars, especially in the Ismenius Lacus quadrangle, are believed to contain large amounts of ice.  The most popular model for the origin of the ice is climate change from large changes in the tilt of the planet's rotational axis.  At times the tilt has even been greater than 80 degrees   Large changes in the tilt explains many ice-rich features on Mars.

Studies have shown that when the tilt of Mars reaches 45 degrees from its current 25 degrees, ice is no longer stable at the poles.   Furthermore, at this high tilt, stores of solid carbon dioxide (dry ice) sublimate, thereby increasing the atmospheric pressure.  This increased pressure allows more dust to be held in the atmosphere.  Moisture in the atmosphere will fall as snow or as ice frozen onto dust grains.  Calculations suggest this material will concentrate in the mid-latitudes.  General circulation models of the Martian atmosphere predict accumulations of ice-rich dust in the same areas where ice-rich features are found.
When the tilt begins to return to lower values, the ice sublimates (turns directly to a gas) and leaves behind a lag of dust.   The lag deposit caps the underlying material so with each cycle of high tilt levels, some ice-rich mantle remains behind.   The smooth surface mantle layer probably represents only relative recent material.

Geomorphology

Concentric crater fill, lineated valley fill, and lobate debris aprons

Several types of landforms have been identified as probably dirt and rock debris covering huge deposits of ice. Concentric crater fill (CCF) contains dozens to hundreds of concentric ridges that are caused by the movements of sometimes hundreds of meter thick accumulations of ice in craters. Lineated valley fill (LVF)are lines of ridges in valleys. These lines may have developed as other glaciers moved down valleys.  Some of these glaciers seem to come from material sitting around mesas and buttes. Lobate debris aprons (LDA) is the name given to these glaciers.  All of these features that are believed to contain large amounts of ice are found in the mid-latitudes in both the Northern and Southern hemispheres.  These areas are sometimes called Fretted terrain because it is sometimes winkled.  With the superior resolution of cameras on Mars Global Surveyor (MGS) and MRO, we have found the surface of LDA’s, LVF, and CCFs’ have a complex tangle of ridges that resemble the surface of the human brain.  Wide ridges are called closed-cell brain terrain, and the less common narrow ridges are called open-cell brain terrain.  It is thought that the wide closed-cell terrain still contains a core of ice, that when it eventually disappears the center of the wide ridge collapses to produce the narrow ridges of the open-cell brain terrain.
Today it is widely accepted that glacier-like forms, lobate debris aprons, lineated valley fill, and concentric fill are all related in that they have the same surface texture.  Glacier-like forms in valleys and cirque-like alcoves may coalesce with others to produce lobate debris aprons.  When opposing lobate debris aprons converge, linear valley fill results 

Many of these features are found in the Northern hemisphere in parts of a boundary called the Martian dichotomy. The Martian dichotomy is mostly found between 0 and 70 E longitudes.  Near this area are regions that are named from ancient names: Deuteronilus Mensae, Protonilus Mensae, and Nilosyrtis Mensae.

Tongue-shaped glaciers 
Some of the glaciers flow down mountains and are shaped by obstacles and valleys; they make a sort of tongue shape.

Hummocky relief
A hummocky relief resembling Northern Sweden's Veiki moraines has been found in Nereidum Montes. The relief is hypothesized to result from the melting of a Martian glacier.

There is no current evidence of any glaciers on any of the volcanoes on Mars

Ice sheet

There is much evidence for a large ice sheet that existed in the south polar region of the planet.  A large number of eskers which form under ice are found there.  The field of eskers make up the Dorsa Argentea Formation.  The ice sheet had an area twice that of the state of Texas.

Ground ice

Mars has vast glaciers hidden under a layer of rocky debris over wide areas in the mid-latitudes.  These glaciers could be large reservoir of life-supporting water on the planet for simple life forms and for future colonists. Research by John Holt, of the University of Texas at Austin, and others found that one of the features examined is three times larger than the city of Los Angeles and up to 800 m thick, and there are many more.

Some of the glacial-like features were revealed by NASA's Viking orbiters in the 1970s.  Since that time glacial-like features have been studied by more and more advanced instruments.  Much better data has been received from Mars Global Surveyor, Mars Odyssey, Mars Express, and Mars Reconnaissance Orbiter.

Gallery

Interactive Mars map

See also

 Areography (geography of Mars)
 Climate of Mars
 Deuteronilus Mensae
 Dorsa Argentea Formation
 Fretted terrain 
 Geology of Mars
 Glacier 
 Ismenius Lacus quadrangle 
 Lineated valley fill
 Martian dichotomy
 Nilosyrtis Mensae
 Protonilus Mensae 
 Tharsis quadrangle
 Water on Mars

References

External links 
 Martian Ice - Jim Secosky - 16th Annual International Mars Society Convention
 https://www.youtube.com/watch?v=kpnTh3qlObk[T. Gordon Wasilewski - Water on Mars - 20th Annual International Mars Society Convention]  Describes how to get water from ice in the ground
 High resolution flyover video by Seán Doran of a glacier in Protonilus Mensae, based on NASA digital terrain model; see album for more
 Jeffrey Plaut - Subsurface Ice - 21st Annual International Mars Society Convention

Extraterrestrial bodies of ice
Geology of Mars
Mars
Surface features of Mars
Water on Mars